Rockford Historic District is a national historic district located at Rockford, Surry County, North Carolina. The district encompasses 12 contributing buildings in the central business district of Rockford.  They were primarily built between about 1790 and 1930 and include notable examples of Federal and Greek Revival architecture. Notable buildings include the Methodist Church (1912), former courthouse, York Tavern (c. 1800), Old Post Office, R. H. Clark's Store, the Tobacco Factory, the Grant-Burrus Hotel (c. 1790), and the former Masonic Lodge building.

It was added to the National Register of Historic Places in 1976.

Gallery

References

Historic districts on the National Register of Historic Places in North Carolina
Federal architecture in North Carolina
Greek Revival architecture in North Carolina
Buildings and structures in Surry County, North Carolina
National Register of Historic Places in Surry County, North Carolina